The Atlantic and Great Western Railroad began as three separate railroads: the Erie and New York City Railroad based in Jamestown, New York; the Meadville Railroad based in Meadville, Pennsylvania (renamed A&GW in April 1858); and the Franklin and Warren Railroad based in Franklin Mills, Ohio (renamed A&GW in January 1853).  The owners of the three railroads had been working closely together since an October 8, 1852, meeting in Cleveland to plan an expansion of the "Great Broad Route", the Erie Railroad, through their respective areas.

On March 12, 1862, general control of all three companies was placed under a central board made of two directors from each of the companies. The Ohio Board was represented by Marvin Kent and Worthy S. Streator; the Pennsylvania Board by William Reynolds and John Dick; and the New York Board by A. F. Allen and Thomas W. Kennard. William Reynolds was elected President of the Board.  The line reached Cleveland on November 18, 1863, and was connected to the Cincinnati, Hamilton and Dayton Railroad in Dayton on June 20, 1864; thus linking St. Louis with New York via a  gauge line.

On August 19, 1865, an agreement was drafted to merge the three separate companies, each named Atlantic and Great Western Railroad, into the Atlantic and Great Western Railway. On October 5 of that year the new company issued a $30 million mortgage to pay off the outstanding mortgages on various companies included in the merger.

The company went into the hands of a receiver, Robert B. Potter of New York, on April 1, 1867. Potter operated the railroad until December 1868 when it was leased for 12 years by the Erie Railroad. Jay Gould, then president of the Erie, arranged to have the company again placed into receivership, this time with Gould and W. A. O'Doherty as receivers. This receivership was transferred to Reuben Hitchcock of Cleveland in November 1869. In February 1870, the Erie again leased the company, pending foreclosure. The foreclosure took place and the property was purchased on July 26, 1871, by Gen. George B. McClellan, William Butler Duncan and Allen G. Thurman. A deed for the property was finalized on October 3, 1871. The new company was named the Atlantic and Great Western Railway, the same as the old, but on consolidation of the individual parts (one in each state) in November, the name was changed back to the Atlantic and Great Western Railroad.

In May 1874, the Atlantic and Great Western was again leased by the Erie, at terms very generous to the A&GW and its backer James McHenry. On December 10, 1874, the new president of the Erie, Hugh J. Jewett, repudiated the lease and the company went into the hands of a new receiver, J. H. Devereaux. This action led to a series of lawsuits between McHenry and Jewett which brought shame to both companies. On January 10, 1880, the property was again sold at foreclosure and was reorganized as the New York, Pennsylvania and Ohio Railroad.

See also

 Samuel Cochrane
 Cambridge Springs (Erie Railroad station)

External links
Western New York Railroad Archive

References
Hungerford, Edward. Men of Erie: A Story of Human Effort. New York:  Random House, 1946.
Mott, Edward. Between the Ocean and the Lakes - The Story of Erie. New York, NY: J.S. Collins. 1899.
 Reynolds, William, Peter K. Gifford, and Robert D. Ilisevich. European Capital, British Iron, and an American Dream: The Story of the Atlantic & Great Western Railroad (The University of Akron Press, 2002).

Defunct New York (state) railroads
Defunct Pennsylvania railroads
Defunct Ohio railroads
History of Kent, Ohio
Predecessors of the Erie Railroad
Railway companies established in 1853
Railway companies disestablished in 1865
Railway companies established in 1871
Railway companies disestablished in 1880
6 ft gauge railways in the United States
American companies disestablished in 1880
American companies established in 1853
American companies disestablished in 1865
American companies established in 1871